Ataf or ATAF may refer to:

African Tax Administration Forum, an organization for coöperation among African tax authorities
Allied Tactical Air Force, former NATO military formations under Allied Air Forces Central Europe
Second Allied Tactical Air Force (2 ATAF, 1958–1993)
Fourth Allied Tactical Air Force (4 ATAF, 1951–1993)
Ataf Khawaja, Danish rap artist of Pakistani origin

See also
Atif